Le Timbre-Poste was the first French language philatelic magazine. It was published by Jean-Baptiste Moens of Brussels from 1863 to 1900. Le Timbre Fiscal was included as a supplement from volume 17 of 1879 and incorporated from January 1897 when the whole was renamed Le Timbre-Poste et Le Timbre Fiscal. After Moens retired in 1900 it was discovered that his brother-in-law, Louis Hanciau, had actually been responsible for most of the literary content of Le Timbre-Poste.

References

1863 establishments in Belgium
1900 disestablishments in Belgium
Magazines published in Belgium
Defunct magazines published in Belgium
French-language magazines
Hobby magazines
Magazines established in 1863
Magazines disestablished in 1900
Magazines published in Brussels
Philatelic periodicals